Roope Tonteri (born 18 March 1992 in Valkeala) is a Finnish snowboarder. He studied in Vuokatti.

Tonteri won gold in slopestyle and big air at the 2013 FIS Snowboarding World Championships. He also won gold in big air at 2015 FIS Snowboarding World Championships. Tonteri participated in Winter Olympic Games in 2014 and 2018.

References

External links
 
 
 
 

1992 births
Living people
People from Valkeala
Finnish male snowboarders
Snowboarders at the 2014 Winter Olympics
Snowboarders at the 2018 Winter Olympics
Olympic snowboarders of Finland
Sportspeople from Kymenlaakso